Teen Titans is the name of a comic book series by DC Comics.

Teen Titans may also refer to:

Teen Titans (TV series), an animated television series based on the comic book series
Teen Titans Go! (TV series), a subsequent animated television series with the same characters
Teen Titans (2005 video game), a video game released for the Game Boy Advance
Teen Titans (2006 video game), a video game released for the GameCube, PlayStation 2, and Xbox

See also

 
 
 Titan (comics)
 Titan (disambiguation)
 Teen (disambiguation)